Robert Francis Winston (born 28 November 1979) is an Irish jockey who competes in Flat racing.

Biography 
He was the British flat racing Champion Apprentice in 1999 and won the Group 1 Cheveley Park Stakes on Magical Romance in 2004. In 2016, he won the Lester Award for flat ride of the year. After a gap of thirteen years, he added a second Group 1 victory in the 2017 British Champions Sprint Stakes at Ascot on Librisa Breeze, the biggest win of his career.

Winston retired in September 2019, having ridden 1,627 winners in Britain over his 23-year career In September 2021 he came out of retirement to resume his career and rode his first winner since retirement on 11 October 2021.

Major wins 
 Great Britain
British Champions Sprint Stakes - Librisa Breeze (2017)
Cheveley Park Stakes - Magical Romance (2004)

References 

1979 births
Irish jockeys
British Champion apprentice jockeys
Lester Award winners
Living people